The 1954 All-Ireland Junior Hurling Championship was the 33rd staging of the All-Ireland Junior Championship since its establishment by the Gaelic Athletic Association in 1912.

Cork entered the championship as the defending champions, however, they were beaten by Kerry in the Munster final.

The All-Ireland final was played on 3 October 1954 at Austin Stack Park in Tralee, between Kerry and London, in what was their first ever meeting in the final. Kerry won the match by 1–07 to 1-05 to claim their eighth championship title overall and a first title in five years.

Results

All-Ireland Junior Football Championship

All-Ireland semi-finals

All-Ireland home final

All-Ireland final

References

Junior
All-Ireland Junior Football Championship